Ismail Kadare (spelled Ismaïl Kadaré in French; born 28 January 1936) is an Albanian novelist, poet, essayist, screenwriter, and playwright. He is a leading international literary figure and intellectual. He focused on poetry until the publication of his first novel, The General of the Dead Army, which made him famous internationally.

In 1992, Kadare was awarded the Prix mondial Cino Del Duca; in 1998, the Herder Prize; in 2005, the inaugural Man Booker International Prize; in 2009, the Prince of Asturias Award of Arts; and in 2015, the Jerusalem Prize. He was awarded the Park Kyong-ni Prize in 2019, and the Neustadt International Prize for Literature in 2020. In 1996, France made him a foreign associate of the Académie des Sciences Morales et Politiques of France, and in 2016, he was a Commandeur de la Légion d'Honneur recipient. He has been nominated for the Nobel Prize in Literature 15 times. Since the 1990s, Kadare has been asked  by both major political parties in Albania to become a consensual President of Albania, but has declined.

His nominating juror for the Neustadt Prize wrote: "Kadare is the successor of Franz Kafka. No one since Kafka has delved into the infernal mechanism of totalitarian power and its impact on the human soul in as much hypnotic depth as Kadare." His writing has also been compared to that of Nikolai Gogol, George Orwell, Gabriel García Márquez, Milan Kundera, and Balzac. Living in Albania during a time of strict censorship, Kadare devised cunning stratagems to outwit Communist censors who had banned three of his books, using devices such as parable, myth, fable, folk-tale, allegory, and legend, sprinkled with double-entendre, allusion, insinuation, satire, and coded messages. In 1990, to escape the Communist regime and its Sigurimi secret police he defected to Paris. His works have been published in 45 languages. The New York Times wrote that he was a national figure in Albania comparable in popularity perhaps to Mark Twain in the United States, and that "there is hardly an Albanian household without a Kadare book."

Kadare is regarded by some as one of the greatest writers and intellectuals of the 20th and 21st centuries, and as a universal voice against totalitarianism. He is the husband of author Helena Kadare, and the father of United Nations Ambassador, and UN General Assembly Vice President, Besiana Kadare.

Early and personal life 
Ismail Kadare was born in the Kingdom of Albania during the reign of King Zog I. He was born in Gjirokastër, an historic Ottoman Empire fortress mountain city of tall stone houses in southern Albania, a dozen miles from the border with Greece. He lived there on a crooked, narrow street known as "Lunatics' Lane".

His parents were Halit Kadare, a post office employee, and Hatixhe Dobi, a homemaker, who had married in 1933 when his mother was 17 years old.  On his mother's side of the family, his great-grandfather was a Bejtexhi of the Bektashi Order, known as Hoxhë Dobi. Though he was born into a Muslim family, Kadare himself was an atheist.

Three years after Kadare was born, Italian Prime Minister Benito Mussolini's troops invaded Albania and ousted the Albanian King. Italian rule followed. Kadare was nine years old when Italian troops were withdrawn, and the communist-led People's Socialist Republic of Albania was established.

Kadare attended primary and secondary schools in Gjirokastër. He then studied Languages and Literature at the Faculty of History and Philology of the University of Tirana. In 1956, Kadare received a teacher's diploma. He lived in Tirana, Albania, until he became a resident of France in 1990. His Tirana apartment was converted into a museum in 2019, showcasing the work and life of the author.

He is married to Albanian author Helena Gushi, and has two daughters. His daughter Besiana Kadare is the Albanian Ambassador to the United Nations, Albania's Ambassador to Cuba, and a Vice President of the United Nations General Assembly for its 75th session.

Literary career

Early literary career 

At age 11, Kadare read William Shakespeare's play Macbeth. He recalled years later: "Because I did not yet understand that I could simply purchase it in a bookstore, I copied much of it by hand and took it home. My childhood imagination pushed me to feel like a co-author of the play."

He soon became entranced by literature. At age 12, Kadare wrote his first short stories, which were published in the Pionieri (Pioneer) journal in Tirana, a communist magazine for children. In 1954 he published his first collection of poems, Frymëzime djaloshare (Boyish inspirations). In 1957 he published a poetry collection entitled Ëndërrimet (Dreams).

At 17, Kadare won a poetry contest in Tirana, which allowed him to travel to Moscow to study at the Maxim Gorky Literature Institute. He studied literature during the Khrushchev era, doing post-graduate work from 1958 to 1960. His training had as its goal for him to become a communist writer and "engineer of human souls," to help construct a culture of the new Albania. In Moscow he met writers united under the banner of Socialist Realism—a style of art characterized by the idealized depiction of revolutionary communist values, such as the emancipation of the proletariat. Kadare also had the opportunity to read contemporary Western literature, including works by Jean Paul Sartre, Albert Camus, and Ernest Hemingway. Kadare, however, rejected the canons of Socialist Realism, and committed himself internally to write opposed to dogmatism. He also cultivated contempt for the nomenklatura, an attitude which, he later wrote, was the product of his youthful arrogance rather than of considered political opposition. During his time in the Soviet Union, Kadare published a collection of poetry in Russian, and in 1959 also wrote his first novel, Qyteti pa reklama (The City Without Signs), a critique of socialist careerism in Albania.

Kadare returned home in October 1960 on Albanian orders, before Albania's breaking of political and economic ties with the USSR. He lived for the next 30 years in Tirana, in an apartment which now houses the Ismail Kadare House museum and archives. He worked as a journalist, became editor-in-chief of the literary periodical Les Lettres Albanaises (Albanian Letters; published simultaneously in Albanian and French), and then contributed to the literary review Drita for five years, while embarking on a literary career of his own.

At that time Kadare had a reputation for poetry. In 1961 he published a volume of poetry entitled Shekulli im (My Century). His work was particularly popular with Albanian youth. His future wife Helena, then a schoolgirl, wrote a fan letter to the young writer, which eventually led to their marriage in 1963.

Kadare wrote one of his earliest pieces in the 1960s, a poem entitled "The Princess Argjiro." Locally inspired, the poem transforms the centuries-old myth of the legendary 15th century Princess Argjiro, who was said to have jumped off Gjirokastër Castle along with her child so as to avoid being captured by the Ottomans. The poem was denounced and an official reader's report was commissioned, which maintained he had committed historical and ideological errors. Kadare was criticized implicitly for disregarding socialist literary principles.

In 1962, Kadare published an excerpt from his first novel as a short story under the title "Coffeehouse Days" in a communist youth magazine.  It was then banned immediately after publication, contributing to his reputation for "decadence". Due to this criticism and advice from his friends, Kadare did not publish the full novel until 1990.

In 1963, at 26 years of age, Kadare published his novel The General of the Dead Army, about an army general and priest who, 20 years after World War II, are sent to Albania to locate the remains of fallen Italian soldiers and return them to Italy for burial. The novel faced criticism by Albanian literary critics for flouting socialist ideals and for its dark tone. The novel was thus in stark contrast to those of other Albanian writers of the time, who glorified the Communist revolution. The novel inspired three films: Luciano Tovoli's 1983 The General of the Dead Army (Il generale dell'armata morta) in Italian starring Marcello Mastroianni and Michel Piccoli, Bertrand Tavernier's 1989 Life and Nothing But (La Vie et rien d’autre) in French starring Philippe Noiret, and Dhimitër Anagnosti's 1989 The Return of the Dead Army (Kthimi i ushtrisë së vdekur) in Albanian starring Bujar Lako. Though it is his best-known novel, and Kadare views it as "good literature", he does not view it as his best work.

In 1964 he wrote Përse mendohen këto male (What are these mountains thinking about?). His next short novel, The Monster (Përbindëshi), published in the literary magazine Nëntori in 1965, was labeled "decadent" and banned upon publication; it was Kadare's second ban.

By the mid-1960s, the cultural censorship thaw of the early part of the decade was over, and conditions changed dramatically. In 1967, Albania launched its own Cultural Revolution. Kadare was exiled for two years along with other Albanian writers to Berat in the countryside, to learn about life alongside the peasants and workers. Two Albanian dramatists were at the time also sentenced to eight years in prison each. Albanian writers and artists encountered indifference from the world outside Albania, which did not speak in their support.

International breakthrough (1970–80) 
The General of the Dead Army was Kadare's first great success outside Albania. The French translation by Isuf Vrioni, published in 1970 in Paris by publisher Albin Michel, led to Kadare's international breakthrough. In the ironic novel, an Italian general and Italian Army priest return to Albania 20 years after World War II, to find and bring back to Italy for final burial there the bodies of Italian soldiers killed in the war. The French publishing house published the novel without Kadare's knowledge or permission, as Albania at the time was not a signatory to the Universal Copyright Convention and there was no copyright protection on the text.  Once the book appeared in France, it was translated into most European languages. By 1977 it had been translated into over 20 languages, with the Albanian communist press hailing it as "one of the most successful translations of the world of the 70s."

After the success of the novel in the West in 1970, the older generation of Albanian writers and dogmatic literary critics became extremely embittered against the "darling of the West": "This novel was published by the bourgeoisie and this cannot be accepted", said a report by the Albanian secret police. Kadare's enemies in the secret police and the old guard of the Albanian Politburo referred to him as an agent of the West, which was one of the most dangerous accusations that could be made in Albania. However, Kadare continued to publish in his home country and became widely promoted in his home country, with frequent references in the Albanian press to new releases and translations of his work, with Kadare being hailed as a "hero of the new Albanian literature". Kadare's work was described as "treat[ing] many problems preoccupying" Albanian society, and as "mak[ing] use of the revolution as the organizing element of his writing." He was also lauded as having a "revolutionary drive" which "keeps pace with life and fights against old ideas."

In 1971 Kadare published the novel Chronicle in Stone, in which the narrator is a young Albanian boy whose old stone city hometown is caught up in World War II, and successively occupied by Greek, Italian, and German forces. The novel has been described as "magic realism."  John Updike wrote in The New Yorker, that it was "a thoroughly enchanting novel — sophisticated and accomplished in its poetic prose and narrative deftness, yet drawing resonance from its roots in one of Europe's most primitive societies." The book was heavily publicized in the Albanian press, both domestically and in magazines aimed at promoting Albanian socialism and culture to an international audience, such as New Albania.

Throughout the 1970s, Kadare began to work more with myths, legends, and the distant past, often drawing allusions between the Ottoman Empire and present-day Albania. At this time, he also worked as an editor and contributor to New Albania, an arts and culture magazine which sought to promote Albanian socialism to a worldwide audience.

In 1970, Kadare published Kështjella (The Castle or The Siege) which was celebrated in both Albania and Western Europe, seeing a translation into French in 1972. It detailed war between Albanians and Ottomans during the time of Skanderbeg.

In 1978 he published the novel The Three-Arched Bridge, a political parable set in 1377 in the Balkans, narrated by an Albanian monk.  The New York Times called it "an utterly captivating yarn: strange, vivid, ominous, macabre and wise."

After Kadare offended the authorities with a political poem entitled "The Red Pasha" in 1975 that poked fun at the Albanian Communist bureaucracy, he was denounced, narrowly avoiding being shot, and was ultimately sent to do manual labor in a remote village deep in the central Albania countryside for a short period of time. After his return to Tirana, Kadare increasingly began to publish short novellas.

In 1980 Kadare published the novel Broken April, about the centuries-old tradition of hospitality, blood feuds, and revenge killing in the highlands of north Albania in the 1930s. The New York Times, reviewing it, wrote: "Broken April is written with masterly simplicity in a bardic style, as if the author is saying: Sit quietly and let me recite a terrible story about a blood feud and the inevitability of death by gunfire in my country. You know it must happen because that is the way life is lived in these mountains. Insults must be avenged; family honor must be upheld...." The novel was made into a 2001 Brazilian movie entitled Behind the Sun (Abril Despedaçado) by filmmaker Walter Salles, set in 1910 Brazil and starring Rodrigo Santoro, which was nominated for a BAFTA Award for Best Film Not in the English Language and a Golden Globe Award for Best Foreign Language Film.

Controversy and tension in Albania (1981–90) 
In 1981, Kadare published The Palace of Dreams, an anti-totalitarian fantasy novel. In the novel, an authoritarian dystopia (the imaginary U.O.S.; the United Ottoman States) through an enormous bureaucratic entity (the Palace of Dreams) collects every dream in the empire, sorts it, files it, analyses it, and reports the most dangerous ones to the Sultan.  Kadare first published an excerpt of the novel as a short story, alongside some of his other new works, in his 1980 collection of four novellas, Gjakftohtësia (Cold-bloodedness). The following year, under the same title, Kadare published the completed novel in the second edition of Emblema e dikurshme (Signs of the Past); despite its political themes, it was not censored by the Albanian authorities.

After publishing The Palace of Dreams, readers began to draw comparisons between its critique of totalitarianism and the current government of Albania. At a meeting of the Albanian Writers Union, Kadare was accused by the president of the Union of deliberately evading politics by cloaking much of his fiction in history and folklore, and The Palace of Dreams was expressly condemned in the presence of several members of the Albanian Politburo.  Kadare was accused of attacking the government in a covert manner, and the novel was viewed by the authorities as an anticommunist work and a mockery of the political system.  As a result, the work was banned—but not before 20,000 copies had been sold. The authorities were initially reluctant to imprison or purge Kadare, as he had become an internationally recognized literary figure and it would have caused an international backlash – which, given the country's rapid economic decline, the government wanted to avoid at all costs. Western press reacted to the condemnation of The Palace of Dreams, and protests mounted in the West in defense of the author. Of all his books, it is the one Kadare is most proud of having written.

That same year Kadare finished his novel The Concert, a satirical account of the Sino-Albanian split, but it was criticized by the authorities and was not published until 1988.

Communist Albanian leader Enver Hoxha presided over a Stalinist regime of forced collectivization and suppression from the end of World War II until 1985.  He initiated a process of eliminating Kadare, but backed off due to Western reaction. There was, however, a nightly presence of authorities outside of Kadare's apartment. Albanian historian and scholar Anton Logoreci described Kadare during this time as "a rare sturdy flower growing, inexplicably, in a largely barren patch."

In January 1985 Kadare's novel A Moonlit Night was published, only to be banned by the authorities. On 9 April 1985 Hoxha fell into a coma; the next night he died, aged 76. On the evening of the ailing dictator's death, members of the Union of Writers, the Albanian Politburo, and the Central Committee of the Communist Party hastily organized a meeting in order to condemn Kadare's latest novel Moonlit Night.

That same year Kadare wrote the novella Agamemnon's Daughter – a direct critique, set in the 1970s, of the oppressive regime in Albania. It was smuggled out of the country, with the help of Kadare's French editor Claude Durand, but was not published until 2003.

In 1990 Kadare requested a meeting with Albanian President Ramiz Alia, at which he urged him to end human rights abuses, implement democratic and economic reforms, and end the isolation of Albania. Kadare was disappointed with Alia's slow reaction.

Political asylum in France (1990–present)
In October 1990, after he criticized the Albanian government, urged democratization of isolationist Albania—Europe's last Communist-ruled country (then totalling 3.3 million people), and faced the ire of its authorities and – the final straw – threats from the Albanian Sigurimi secret police, Kadare sought and received political asylum in France. He defected to Paris; since then he has lived primarily in Paris, and temporarily after a time in Tirana. He had decided to defect because he had become disillusioned with the government of Ramiz Alia, legal opposition was not allowed in Albania, and he had become convinced "that more than any action I could take in Albania, my defection would help the democratization of my country."  The New York Times wrote that he was a national figure in Albania comparable in popularity perhaps to Mark Twain in the United States, and that "there is hardly an Albanian household without a Kadare book, and even foreign visitors are presented with volumes of his verse as souvenirs."

The official Albanian press agency reacted by issuing a statement on "this ugly act," saying Kadare had placed himself "in the services of the enemies of Albania." Some intellectuals, at great personal risk, publicly supported Kadare, whom the authorities had declared a traitor. Poet Dritero Agolli who headed the Albanian Writers' Union said: "I continue to have great respect for his work." Despite this, his books were not fully banned by the communist authorities, and he remained a popular and celebrated author.

After receiving political asylum and settling in France, Kadare continued to write. His exile in Paris was fruitful and enabled him to succeed further, writing both in Albanian and in French.

His 1992 novel The Pyramid is a political allegory set in Egypt in the 26th century BC, focusing on intrigues behind the construction of the Great Pyramid of Cheops. In it, Kadare mocked any dictator's love for hierarchy and useless monuments. In some of Kadare's novels, comprising the so-called "Ottoman Cycle", the Ottoman Empire is used as the archetype of a totalitarian state. In 1993, the novel was awarded the Prix Méditerranée Étranger in France.

In 1994 he began to work on the first bilingual volume of his work with the French publishing house Fayard. The same year he wrote on command, in Paris, for the French editor Flammarion, the essay "La légende des légendes" (The legend of legends) that was immediately translated to French and published in 1995.

Kadare's 1996 novel Spiritus marks a narrative and compositional turning point in his literary career. In it, two ghosts return to a post-Communist world. The influence of this novel is felt in all of Kadare's subsequent novels. It deals with a group of foreigners who are touring Eastern Europe after the fall of Communism and hear exciting rumours during their stay in Albania about the capture of the spirit from the dead. As it turns out, the spirit is in fact a listening device known to the notorious secret service as a "hornet".

His 2008 novel The Fall of the Stone City was awarded the Rexhai Surroi Prize in Kosovo, and was shortlisted for the Independent Foreign Fiction Prize in 2013.

His semi-autobiographical novel The Doll was published in 2020. It focuses on Kadare's complex bonds with his mother and his country.

Since the 1990s, Kadare has been asked multiple times by both major political parties in Albania to run for President of Albania, but has declined.

Awards 

In 1992, Kadare was awarded the Prix mondial Cino Del Duca international literary award in France. In 1996 he was made a lifetime member of the Academy of Moral and Political Sciences of France (Académie des Sciences Morales et Politiques), one of the five Academies that make up the Institut de France learned society, in the chair vacated by the recently deceased philosopher Karl Popper. In 1998 he was awarded the international Herder Prize in Austria. In 2003 he received the Ovid Prize international award in Romania, and the Presidential Gold Medal of the League of Prizren from the President of Kosovo.

In 2005 he received the inaugural Man Booker International Prize in the United Kingdom for the full body of his work. In his acceptance speech, Kadare said: "We propped each other up as we tried to write literature as if that regime did not exist. Now and again we pulled it off. At other times we didn't."

In 2008 he received the Flaiano Prize international award in Italy. In 2009, Kadare was awarded the Prince of Asturias Award for Literature in Spain, for his literary works.

In 2015, Kadare was awarded the bi-annual Jerusalem Prize in Israel. Speaking of the relationship between Albania and the Jews, Kadare said: "I come from one of the few countries in the world which helped the Jews during World War II. I believe the number of Jews there grew from 200 at the start of the war to 2,000 by the end. The population always defended the Jews, whether during the kingdom, under Communism, or after it." He noted that during the Holocaust Albanians refused to hand Jews over to the Nazis, and many Albanians went to great lengths to protect Jewish refugees who had fled to Albania. He also noted that Albania and Israel share in common the experience of "fighting for survival" in a sometimes hostile neighborhood.

In 2016, Kadare became the first Albanian Commandeur de la Légion d'Honneur recipient, with the award being given to him by French President François Hollande.  That year he was also awarded the Albanian National Flag Decoration, Albania's highest decoration, by Albanian President Bujar Nishani. He won the 2018 International Nonino Prize in Italy.

He won the 2019 Park Kyong-ni Prize, from a list of 350 writers, for his literary works during his career. It is an international award based in South Korea.

That year Kadare was also named Grand Officer (Grand officier) of the Legion of Honor by a special decree of French Prime Minister Emmanuel Macron, and thus was ranked among the 250 world-renowned personalities honored by France. The Legion of Honor is the highest state title awarded by France.

Kadare was nominated for the 2020 Neustadt International Prize for Literature (described as the "American Nobel") in the United States by Bulgarian writer Kapka Kassobova. He was selected as the 2020 laureate by the Prize's jury.  He won the 2020 Neustadt International Prize for Literature. In his acceptance speech, he observed: "There is no room for literature in the Marxist vision of the future world." His nominating juror wrote: "Kadare is the successor of Franz Kafka. No one since Kafka has delved into the infernal mechanism of totalitarian power and its impact on the human soul in as much hypnotic depth as Kadare."

He also won the 2020 Prozart Award, given by the International Literature Festival "PRO-ZA Balkan," for his contributions to the development of the literature in Balkans.

Kadare has received the President of the Republic of Albania "Honor of the Nation" Decoration, and the French state order "Cross of the Legion of Honor". He is also a member of the Academy of Albania, the Berlin Academy of Arts, and the Mallarmé Academy, and was awarded honorary doctorates in 1992 from the University of Grenoble III in France, in 2003 from the University of Pristina in Kosovo, and in 2009 from the University of Palermo in Italy.

Kadare has been nominated for the Nobel Prize in Literature 15 times. He has stated that the press has spoken about him being a potential Nobel Prize winner so much, that "many people think that I’ve already won it".

Legacy 
Kadare is considered to be one of the greatest living writers. The London newspaper The Independent said of Kadare: "He has been compared to Gogol, Kafka and Orwell. But Kadare's is an original voice, universal but deeply rooted in his own soil". The New York Times said his fiction has been compared with that of Gabriel García Márquez, as well as Milan Kundera, and The Christian Science Monitor wrote he has also been compared with Dostoevsky and Isak Dinesen. Translator and biographer David Bellos wrote that "In some ways, he's like Balzac."  Critic Richard Eder called him "a supreme fictional interpreter of the psychology and physiognomy of oppression."

Kadare's literary works were conceived in the bedrock of tiny Albanian literature, almost unknown before in Europe or the rest of the world.  With Kadare it became known, read, and appreciated. For the first time in its history, through Kadare, Albanian literature has been integrated into wider European and world literature.

Kadare's oeuvre is a literature of resistance. He managed to write normal literature in an abnormal country – a Communist dictatorship. He had to struggle to get his literary works published, going against state policy. At times even putting his life at risk. Dissent was not allowed in Albania.  Kadare noted: "That was not possible. You risked being shot. Not condemned, but shot for a word against the regime. A single word."

Under Hoxha, at least 100,000 people were imprisoned for political reasons or for a word they said or wrote; 5,000, including many writers, were executed.

Kadare devised numerous subtle strategies and cunning stratagems in order to outwit Communist censors.  He used old devices such as parable, myth, fable, folk-tale, allegory, and legend, and sprinkled them with double-entendre, allusion, insinuation, satire, and coded messages.

His oeuvre in general has been in theoretical and practical opposition to the mandatory Socialist Realism required by the State. Kadare challenged Socialist Realism for three decades and opposed it with his subjective realism, avoiding state censorship by using allegorical, symbolic, historical and mythological means.

The conditions in which Kadare lived and published his works were not comparable to other European Communist countries where at least some level of public dissent was tolerated. Rather, the situation in Albania was comparable to North Korea or to the Soviet Union in the 1930s under Stalin. Despite this, Kadare used any opportunity to attack the regime in his works, by means of political allegories, which were picked up by educated Albanian readers. Henri Amouroux, a member of the Académie des Sciences Morales et Politiques of France, pointed out that Soviet dissidents including Solzhenitsyn published their works during the era of de-Stalinization, whereas Kadare lived and published his works in a country which remained Stalinist until 1990.

Work 

By 2020 most of his approximately 80 novels, plays, screenplays, poetry, essays, and story collections had been translated into different languages. His works have been published in 45 languages.

Among his best-known books are The General of the Dead Army (1963), The Siege (1970), The Ghost Rider (1980), Broken April (1980; blood feuds in the highlands of north Albania), The Palace of Dreams (1981), The Pyramid (1992), and The Successor (2003; regarding the mysterious death of Hoxha's handpicked successor, Mehmet Shehu).

Some of his works have been translated into English by David Bellos, though not from the Albanian original, but rather from French translations.

English translations 

The following Kadare novels have been translated into English:

 The General of the Dead Army
 The Siege
 Chronicle in Stone
 Broken April
 The Three-Arched Bridge
 The Palace of Dreams
 The Concert
 The File on H
 The Pyramid
 Elegy for Kosovo
 Spring Flowers, Spring Frost
 The Successor
 Agamemnon's Daughter
 The Blinding Order 
 The Fall of the Stone City
 The Accident
 The Ghost Rider
 Twilight of the Eastern Gods
 A Girl in Exile
 The Traitor's Niche
 Essays on World Literature: Aeschylus • Dante • Shakespeare
 Stormy Weather on Mount Olympus
The Doll: A Portrait of My Mother

Works published in Albanian 

The complete works (other than the essays, poetry, and short stories) of Ismail Kadare were published by Fayard, simultaneously in French and Albanian, between 1993 and 2004. Kadare's original Albanian language works have been published exclusively by Onufri Publishing House since 1996, as single works or entire sets. Published in 2009, the set of complete works constituted 20 volumes.

The dates of publication given here are those of the first publication in Albanian, unless stated otherwise.

Quotes
 "Literature led me to freedom, not the other way round."
 "It was only a phrase that went from mouth to mouth and was never quite swallowed."
 "The days were heavy and sticky. All identical, one the same as the other. Soon they would even get rid of their one remaining distinction, the shell of their names: Monday, Tuesday, Thursday."

See also
 Kadare Prize
 Albanian literature
 List of literary works by number of translations
List of refugees

References

Sources

Further reading

 Akademia e Shkencave e Shqipërisë (2008) (in Albanian), Fjalor Enciklopedik Shqiptar 2 (Albanian encyclopedia), Tirana, 
 Elsie, Robert, Historical Dictionary of Albania, New Edition, 2004, 
 Gould, Rebecca. "Allegory and the Critique of Sovereignty: Ismail Kadare's Political Theologies", Studies in the Novel vol. 44, no. 2 (Summer 2012): 208–230.
 Hysa, Shefki, "The Diplomacy of self-denial" (Diplomacia e vetëmohimit), publicistic, Tirana, 2008. 
 Morgan, Peter (2011) "Ismail Kadare's Inner Emigration", in Sara Jones & Meesha Nehru (Eds.), Writing under Socialism, (pp. 131–142). Nottingham, UK: Critical, Cultural and Communications (CCC) Press.
 Morgan, Peter (2011) "Greek Civilisation as a Theme of Dissidence in the Work of Ismail Kadare", Modern Greek Studies (Australia and New Zealand), 15, 16–32.
 Morgan, Peter (2010) Ismail Kadare: The Writer and the Dictatorship 1957–1990, Oxford: Legenda, 2010, Albanian translation 2011.
 Morgan, Peter (2010) Kadare post Communism: Albania, the Balkans and Europe in the Work of Ismail Kadare, 1990–2008, Australian Research Council (ARC)/Discovery Projects (DP).
 Morgan, Peter (2005) "Ismail Kadare: Creativity under Communism", The Australian Newspaper.
 
 Rranzi, Paulin. "Personalities – Missionaries of Peace"  publicistic, (2011), Tirana,

External links 

 National Library of Albania
 
 In the Palace of Nightmares': An Exchange – New York Review of Books
 
 "Poems by Ismail Kadare", Albanianliterature.net.

1936 births
Living people
People from Gjirokastër
People from Tirana
Albanian expatriates in France
Albanian anti-communists
Albanian-language writers
Albanian novelists
Members of the Académie des sciences morales et politiques
Members of the Academy of Sciences of Albania
20th-century novelists
Albanian former Muslims
Former Muslims turned agnostics or atheists
Albanian atheists
20th-century male writers
21st-century male writers
20th-century Albanian poets
21st-century Albanian poets
20th-century Albanian writers
21st-century Albanian writers
21st-century novelists
20th-century short story writers
21st-century short story writers
20th-century atheists
21st-century atheists
Albanian dramatists and playwrights
Albanian male writers
Albanian male short story writers
International Booker Prize winners
Herder Prize recipients
Albanian short story writers
Commandeurs of the Légion d'honneur
Commandeurs of the Ordre des Arts et des Lettres
University of Tirana alumni
Maxim Gorky Literature Institute alumni